Christopher Tony Wolstenholme (born 2 December 1978) is an English musician. He is the bassist and backing vocalist for the rock band Muse.

Early life 
Chris Wolstenholme grew up in the English town of Rotherham before moving to Teignmouth, Devon, where he played drums for a post-punk band. He met Matt Bellamy and Dominic Howard from another band while both bands rehearsed in the same building. Bellamy and Howard convinced Wolstenholme to take up bass and start a new band with them, initially called Rocket Baby Dolls. The band was renamed Muse in 1994.

The members of Muse played in separate school bands during their stay at Teignmouth Community College in the early 1990s. Guitarist Bellamy successfully auditioned for drummer Howard's band, Carnage Mayhem, becoming its singer and songwriter. They asked Wolstenholme, at that time the drummer for "Fixed Penalty", to join as bassist; he agreed and took up bass lessons.

Other work 
Wolstenholme featured on bass for Moriaty's 2015 single "Bones". He also contributed to Rick Parfitt's posthumous solo album Over and Out, which was released in March 2018.

Musicianship 
Wolstenholme's basslines are a central motif of many Muse songs; he combines bass guitar with effects and synthesisers to create overdriven fuzz bass tones. Wolstenholme cited the 2003 song "Hysteria", in which the guitar and bass play two different melodies, as a case where his bassline was as much of a lead instrument as the guitar.

Like Bellamy, Wolstenholme uses touch-screen controllers built into a few of his instruments to control synthesisers and effects including Kaoss Pads or Digitech Whammy pedals.

Wolstenholme mostly plays with his fingers, rather than a plectrum, as he prefers the sound for most songs.  According to the producer Rich Costey, who has worked with Muse on several occasions, "His finger strength is staggering ... He hits the strings really goddamn hard. It sounds that way because that's the way he plays." Wolstenholme wrote and sang lead vocals on two Muse songs, "Liquid State" and "Save Me", from their sixth album, The 2nd Law (2012).

Personal life 
Wolstenholme married his girlfriend, Kelly, on 23 December 2003. They have six children. In April 2010, Chris and Kelly moved to Foxrock, County Dublin, Ireland. In 2012, they moved to London while Muse recorded.

After Wolstenholme and Kelly divorced, Wolstenholme married Caris Ball on 1 December 2018, the day before his 40th birthday. The couple have two children, a daughter and a son, as well as Ball's daughters Tabitha and Indiana, giving Wolstenholme ten children in total.

Wolstenholme is a supporter of Rotherham United, his hometown football team. He holds an honorary doctorate of arts from the University of Plymouth.

Wolstenholme has struggled with alcoholism. In a 2011 interview, he said he would drink so much he would vomit blood, but did not grasp the severity of his situation. His bandmates had tried to broach the subject of his drinking several times without success. Wolstenholme eventually realised that drinking would kill him, as it had his father. His bandmates did not notice his problem for several years; according to Bellamy, "He's such a good musician that his motor skills or something just aren't affected. So he would come in and play brilliantly and then we wouldn't see him for a bit. We'd have a great gig and he'd go off to his room so we wouldn't really know what was going on." Wolstenholme's alcoholism did not affect his playing until the recording of Muse's fifth album The Resistance (2009), at which point he went into rehab. His experiences inspired the lyrics of "Liquid State" and "Save Me", from Muse's sixth album, The 2nd Law (2012).

References

External links 

MUSE: Bassist Chris Wolstenholme. Bass Musician Magazine, 8 January 2009

1978 births
Living people
Muse (band) members
English rock bass guitarists
Male bass guitarists
21st-century English musicians
Progressive metal bass guitarists
People from Rotherham
People from Teignmouth
Musicians from Devon
21st-century bass guitarists